Welles may refer to:
 Welles (name)
 , United States Navy destroyer
 , United States Navy destroyer
 Welles (musician), American

See also 
 Wells (name)
 Wells (disambiguation)